Anniaca was a town of ancient Pontus, inhabited during Byzantine times. 

Its site is located near Eski Kale, Koyulhisar in Asiatic Turkey.

References

Populated places in ancient Pontus
Former populated places in Turkey
Populated places of the Byzantine Empire
History of Sivas Province